Lee Yi-fang (born 10 September 1976) is a Taiwanese luger. She competed in the women's singles event at the 1998 Winter Olympics.

References

External links
 
 

1976 births
Living people
Taiwanese female lugers
Olympic lugers of Taiwan
Lugers at the 1998 Winter Olympics
Place of birth missing (living people)